Yan Ge (pinyin: Yán Gē, born 1984) is the pen name of Chinese writer Dai Yuexing (pinyin: Dài Yuèxíng).

Life and career
Yan Ge was born Dai Yuexing in December 1984 in the Pixian district of Chengdu. She began writing at the age of ten and her first book was published when she was 17 years old.

Yan completed a PhD in comparative literature at Sichuan University and is the Chair of the China Young Writers Association. Her writing includes substantial amounts of her native Sichuanese, rather than Standard Chinese. People’s Literature (Renmin Wenxue ) magazine recently chose her – in a list reminiscent of The New Yorker's ‘20 under 40’ – as one of China's twenty future literary masters. In 2012 she was chosen as Best New Writer by the prestigious Chinese Literature Media Prize. In 2011, she was awarded a visiting scholar position at Duke University. Yan was a guest writer at the Crossing Border Festival in The Hague in November 2012, and has since appeared at numerous literary festivals throughout Europe. She has lived in Dublin with her husband, Daniel, and their child since 2015.

, Yan has been writing in English in addition to Mandarin and Sichuanese. Her debut English fiction, a short story collection, will be published in 2023.

Awards
 2003 - Chinese Literature Media Award
 2002 - 1st prize, New Concept Writing Competition
 2001 - Honored as one of China's Top 10 Young Fiction Writers by the Lu Xun Literature School of the China Writers Association

Publications
  May Queen (2008) - novel
  Sissy Zhong - short story (translated by Nicky Harman)
  White Horse - novella (translated by Nicky Harman)
  Demon-Reflecting Mirror- novella
  "Sad Stories of Pingle Township" (5 stories including White Horse and Demon-Reflecting Mirror).
  "Our Family", 2013.
English translation: The Chilli Bean Paste Clan, translated by Nicky Harman, Balestier Press, 2018; also German and French editions.
 "Record of Strange Beasts", 2006. 
English translation: Strange Beasts of China, translated by Jeremy Tiang, Melville House Publishing, 2021.

References

1984 births
Living people
People's Republic of China novelists
Short story writers from Sichuan
Chinese women short story writers
Chinese women novelists
Chinese expatriates in Ireland
Sichuanese
People's Republic of China short story writers
Sichuan University alumni
Chinese science fiction writers
Women science fiction and fantasy writers
Chinese fantasy writers
Pseudonymous women writers
21st-century pseudonymous writers